Teatro La Quindicina was founded in 1982 Edmonton, Alberta, by Stewart Lemoine at the inaugural Edmonton International Fringe Festival to create comedies for Edmonton audiences. From its origins in the production of All These Heels, the company has grown over the course of over 40 years into a mainstay of Edmonton's theatre scene, producing the comedies of Stewart Lemoine, new plays from the company's ensemble of artists, and vintage comedies from the last mid-century.  

Teatro, which takes its name from a brothel, is one of the resident theatre companies of The Varscona Theatre in Old Strathcona in Edmonton, Alberta, and was among the original companies that created The Varscona Theatre Alliance, along with Shadow Theatre and Die Nasty. Lemoine remains the theatre's resident playwright.

References 

Theatre in Edmonton
Theatre companies in Canada
Organizations established in 1982